Raynham is the name of multiple places

United States:
Raynham, Massachusetts
Raynham Center, Massachusetts
Raynham (New Haven, Connecticut), historic house
Raynham, North Carolina

United Kingdom:
Raynham, Norfolk
site of Raynham Hall

See also
 Rainham (disambiguation)